, real name , is a Japanese actress, voice actress and narrator of film and anime and video games. After graduating from the Toho Gakuen College of Drama and Music, she joined Gekidan Seinenza, a theatrical acting troupe. She is currently independent of any talent management company.

She is married to Daisuke Koshikawa, one of the founders of the comedy troupe Chibikko Gang. Their first child, Shiori, has also done voice acting.

Roles
Her best-known voice roles include Nausicaä in Nausicaä of the Valley of the Wind, Suzuko in Fire Tripper and Kyoko Otonashi in Maison Ikkoku.

She won the role of Nausicaä after she impressed Hayao Miyazaki with her role as Clarisse in his debut film The Castle of Cagliostro, subsequently appearing in two more of his movies, My Neighbor Totoro and Princess Mononoke.

Anime

TV
1977
Seito Shokun (Māru (Mariko Hōjō)
1980
Lupin the Third Part II (Maki Ōyamada in Farewell Beloved Lupin episode)
1982
Combat Mecha Xabungle (Maria Maria; only first 9 episodes) 
Urusei Yatsura (Asuka Mizunokoji, Kiriko Amenomori)
1983
Yume Senshi Wingman (Matsuoka-sensei)
1984
Doraemon (Kībō)
1985
Princess Sarah (Sarah Crewe)
Dirty Pair (Margaret Tainer)
Ninja Senshi Tobikage (Princess Romina Ladorio)
1986
The Wonderful Wizard of Oz (Dorothy)
Maison Ikkoku (Kyoko Otonashi)
Dragon Ball (Mermaid)
Ōi! Ryōma (Sakae Sakaki)
Pippi Longstocking (Japanese dub) (Lady)
Sango-shō Densetsu: Aoi Umi no Elfie (Elfie)
Seishun Anime Zenshū Izu no Odoriko (Kaoru)
1987
City Hunter (Maki Himuro)
1988
Soreike! Anpanman (Shokupanman, Dekako Mom, other voices)
Vampire Princess Miyu (Shinma Enju)
Kiteretsu (Kiteretsu's mother)
1989
The Adventures of Peter Pan (Tinker Bell)
Patlabor: The TV Series (Ayano Fujii)
Legend of Heavenly Sphere Shurato (Goddess of Harmony Vishnu)
1990
Moomin (Mrs. Fillyjonk)
NG Knight Ramune & 40 (Monobe-sensei)
Kyatto Ninden Teyandee (Usa no Tsunade)
1991
Mischievous Twins: The Tales of St. Clare's (Hilary)
Oniisama e (Rei Asaka)
Sally, the Witch (new) (Sumire's mother)
Reporter Blues (Toni)
Pigmario (Shōryō Orie)
Madara (Princess Sakuya)
1992
Floral Magician Mary Bell (Mama Belle)
Tsuyoshi Shikkari Shinasai (Kawakami-sensei)
Kindaichi Case Files (Risa Kurea, Arisa Midō)
Jeanie with the Light Brown Hair (Sister Conrad)
Mikan Enikki
Mama wa Shōgaku 4 Nensei (Sawako Yamaguchi)
1993
Pokonyan! (Momoko-sensei)
Sorcerer Hunters (Big Mama)
1994
Akazukin Chacha (Piisuke, Urara principal, Shiine's mother, other voices)
Asobō!! Hello Kitty (Mama)
1995
Zenki (Rengetsu)
Kūsō Kagaku Sekai Gulliver Boy (Ripley)
1996
Rurouni Kenshin (Tae Sekihara, Sae Sekihara)
Pretty Soldier Sailor Moon Sailor Stars (Akane)
1997
Detective Conan (Yukiko Kudo, Fumiyo Akechi)
Cutie Honey Flash (Claire)
Don't Leave Me Alone, Daisy (Rarako-sensei)
Kindaichi Case Files (Arisa Kure) (ep 16-17)
1998
Eat-Man '98 (Koko)
Princess Nine (Shino Hayakawa)
Silent Möbius (Tomona Yamikumo)
1999
GTO (Chizuru Ōta)
Master Keaton (Anna Plummer)
Shinkai Densetsu Meremanoid (Rūsumirā)
2000
Hidamari no Ki (Geisha)
Kyo Kara Maoh! (Alazon)
2001
I My Me! Strawberry Eggs (Fukiko Kuzuha)
Kiddy Grade (Mrs. Padushka)
2002
Ai Yori Aoshi (Taeko Minazuki's mother and grandmother)
Cyborg 009: The Cyborg Soldier (Ixquic)
Full Moon (Great Mother)
Seven of Seven (Mitsuko Suzuki)
2003
Avenger (Westa)
Mermaid Forest (Towa)
2004
Kurau Phantom Memory (Aine, Kleine)
Ojamajo Doremi Na-i-sho (Hikari Waku)
2005
Black Jack (Sono Eiko)
Bleach (Miyako Shiba)
SoltyRei (Eirenē)
2006
XxxHolic (Hydrangea)
2007
Gin Tama (Mitsuba Okita)
Lucky Star (Kanata Izumi)
2011
Nichijou (Lover's Umbrella at episode 21)
Fractale (Moeran)
Penguindrum (Goddess)
2012
Smile PreCure! (Royal Queen)
Is This a Zombie? of the Dead (Delusion Yū)
2013
Ishida & Asakura (Kinoshita)
2014
Space Dandy (Alethia)
2017
Girls' Last Tour (Eryngii)
Berserk (Flora)
2018
March Comes in Like a Lion (Kōda's Wife)
2021
Dragon Goes House-Hunting (Jörmungandr)
Getter Robo Arc (Ryō Nagare)
2022
Insect Land (Earth)

Unknown date
Hachijū Hiai Sekai Isshū (Chiko)
Hello Kitty: Shiawase no Tulip (Mama)
Kimba the White Lion (new) (Eliza, Ryōna)
Kiteretsu Daihyakka (Michiko Kite, Yoshie Sakurai, Ikue Hanamaru)
Kitty's Paradise (Mama, other voices)
Mister Ajikko (Yoamuhi)
Mizuiro Jidai (Obasan)
Mrs. Pepperpot (Rūri)
Neo Hayper Kids (reader)
Oh! Family (Fii Anderson)
Shūkan Storyland (narration)
Sugar Sugar Rune (Candy)
Super Bikkuriman (Maka Turtle)
Tsubasa Chronicle (Emeraude)
The Ultraman (Mutsumi)
Ulysses 31 (Yumi)
Victorian Romance Emma (Aurelia Jones)
Violinist of Hameln (Queen Horun)
Yu-Gi-Oh! Duel Monsters (Ishizu Ishtar, Priestess Isis)
Zendaman (Eve)

OVA
Seito Shokun! (1980) Mariko Kitashiro)
Dream Hunter Rem (1984) (Yōko Takamiya, Keiko)
Urusei Yatsura (1985) (Asuka Mizunokoji)
Fire Tripper (1985) (Suzuko)
Fight! Iczer One (1985) (Sir Violet)
Maris the Chojo (1986) (Towa)
Maris the Chojo (1986) (Sue)
Hell Target (1987) (Tiki Carmack)
The Irresponsible Captain Tylor (1989) (Miranda)
Devil Hunter Yohko (1990) (Princess Yanagi)
Tokyo Babylon (1990) (Kiriko Kashiwagi)
Iczer Reborn (1990) (Sister Grey)
Here Is Greenwood (1991) (Sumire Hasukawa)
Maison Ikkoku Bangaihen: Ikkokujima Nanpa Shimatsuki (1991) (Kyōko Otonashi)
Maison Ikkoku Prelude (1992) (Kyōko Otonashi)
Giant Robo: The Day the Earth Stood Still (1992) (Ginrei)
Giant Robo: Gin Rei (1994) (Ginrei)
Fire Emblem (1996) (Elis)
Jungle de Ikou! (1997) (Rongo)
Virgin Fleet (1998) (Shiokaze Umino)
Unknown date

Gōshō Aoyama's Collection of Short Stories (Yukiko Fujimine)
Gōshō Aoyama's Collection of Short Stories 2 (Yukiko Kudō)
Hello Kitty (Mama)
Hello Kitty no Hajimete no Christmas Cake (Mama)
Hello Kitty to Issho (Mama)
Kitty to Daniel no Suteki na Christmas (Mama)
Kamen Rider (Ruriko Midorikawa)
Madara (Princess Sakuya)

Mikan Enikki: Mikan America e Iku?!
Salamander (Paola)
Sorcerer Hunters (Big Mama)
Tetsuwan Gin Rei (Ginrei)
Yōchien Sentai Genkizzu (Tomomi-sensei)

Movies
The Castle of Cagliostro (1979) (Clarisse de Cagliostro)
Unico (1983) (Cherry)
Nausicaä of the Valley of the Wind (1984) (Nausicaä)
Fire Tripper (1985) (Suzuko)
Maison Ikkoku: Kanketsuhen (1988) (Kyōko Otonashi)
My Neighbor Totoro (1988) (Mother (Yasuko Kusakabe)
Ocean Waves (TV movie) (1993) (Rikako's father's lover)
Umeboshi Denka: Uchū no Hate kara Banbaroban! (1994) (Mama)
Kazu & Yasu: Hero Tanjō (1995) (Yoshiko Miura)
Chocchan Monogatari (1996) (Chō Kuroyanagi)
Princess Mononoke (1997) (Toki)
One Piece: Clockwork Island Adventure (2001) (Madame)
Case Closed: The Phantom of Baker Street (2002) (Irene Adler)
Children Who Chase Lost Voices (2011) (Lisa/Morisaki's Wife)
Natsume's Book of Friends the Movie (2018) (Yorie Tsumura)
Haikara-san ga Tōru: Part 2 (2018) (Tousei's mother)
Weathering with You (2019) (Mrs. Mamiya)
Belle (2021) (Suzu's Mother)
Aria the Benedizione (2021) (Asuka R. Baggio)

Unknown date
Aitsu to Lullaby: Suiyōbi no Cinderella (that girl)
Utsunomiko: Chijōhen (Nayotake)

Games
Chaos Rings (xxxx) (Theia)
Dissidia Final Fantasy (xxxx) (Cosmos)
Eternal Melody (xxxx) (Tina Harvel)
Fire Emblem Heroes (2019) (Elice, Nagi)
Kessen II (xxxx) (Xun Yu)
Otomedius (xxxx) (Gofer Sisters, Irene, Operetta)
Mugen Senshi Valis (xxxx) (Yuuko Asou)
Shinki Gensō Spectral Souls II (xxxx) (Leilia, Horun)
Super Robot Wars series (xxxx) (Romina Ladorio)
Sword of the Berserk: Guts' Rage (xxxx) (Eliza, Annette)
Xexex (xxxx) (Elaine Laccius)
Umineko When They Cry (xxxx) (Kasumi Sumadera)
Sakura Wars 2 (1998) (Margueritte Chateaubriand)
Tactics Ogre: Reborn (2022) (Olivya Phoraena)

Radio
Seishun Adventure: Hiroshi Mori's "Joō no Hyaku Hisshitsu" (Queen Debō Suho)

CD
20-mensō ni Onegai!! Koi hodo Suteki na Musical ha nai (Utako Ōkawa)
Koisuru KI·MO·CHI (as Kyōko Otonashi)

Live action
Tarō no Seishun (TV, 1980), Setsuko Muramatsu
 Let's Talk About the Old Times (Film, 2022), herself

Dubbing
Carrie Fisher
Jay and Silent Bob Strike Back (Nun)
Star Wars (Princess Leia Organa)
The Empire Strikes Back (Princess Leia Organa)
Return of the Jedi (Princess Leia Organa)
Joey Wong
100 Ways to Murder Your Wife (Wang Hsiao Hsien)
A Chinese Ghost Story (Nip Siu Sin)
A Chinese Ghost Story II (Windy Fu Ching Fung)
A Chinese Ghost Story III (Lotus)
Angel Heart (Epiphany Proudfoot (Lisa Bonet))
Another Stakeout (A.D.A. Gina Garrett (Rosie O'Donnell))
Arsène Lupin (Clarisse de Dreux-Soubise (Eva Green))
The Assassins (Lingju / Diaochan (Liu Yifei))
Basic Instinct (Catherine Tramell (Sharon Stone))
Creator (Barbara Spencer (Virginia Madsen))
The Crow: Wicked Prayer (Lilly (Emmanuelle Chriqui))
Dangerous Liaisons (Madame Marie de Tourvel (Michelle Pfeiffer))
F/X2 (Kim Brandon (Rachel Ticotin))
The Fisher King (Lydia Sinclair (Amanda Plummer))
Green Card (Brontë Parrish (Andie MacDowell))
Honey, I Shrunk the Kids (Mae Thompson (Kristine Sutherland))
Inferno (Sara (Eleonora Giorgi))
Jack Frost (Gabby Frost (Kelly Preston))
Johnny Handsome (Donna McCarty (Elizabeth McGovern))
A Little Princess (Sara Crewe (Amelia Shankley))
Little Women (Elizabeth "Beth" March (Margaret O'Brien))
Mannequin (Ema "Emmy" Hesire (Kim Cattrall))
The Mean Season (Christine Connelly (Mariel Hemingway))
Mercy Mission: the Rescue of Flight 771 (Ellen (Rebecca Rigg))
Miss Marple: A Caribbean Mystery
Mr. Nice Guy (Diana (Gabrielle Fitzpatrick))
One True Love (Tina (Paget Brewster))
Pinocchio (Blue Fairy (Nicoletta Braschi))
Poltergeist (Carol Anne Freeling (Heather O'Rourke))
Poltergeist II: The Other Side (Carol Anne Freeling (Heather O'Rourke))
Sahara (Dale Gordon (Brooke Shields))
She-Devil (Mary Fisher (Meryl Streep))
The Sixth Sense (Anna Crowe (Olivia Williams))
Stormy Monday (Kate (Melanie Griffith))
Stuart Little 2 (Margalo (Melanie Griffith); voice)
Terminal Velocity (Chris Morrow (Nastassja Kinski))
Three Men and a Baby (Sylvia Bennington (Nancy Travis))
Watchmen (Sally Jupiter (Carla Gugino))
Wolf (Laura Alden (Michelle Pfeiffer))

Other
All Finish Tōkyō Midnight: Natsumi's Eye (Natsumi Kawahara)
I Can Hear the Sea (dialect coach)

Awards
 Anime Grand Prix: Voice actress of the Year (3): 1984, 1987, 1988
 11th Seiyu Awards: Kazue Takahashi Memorial Award (1): 2017

References

External links
Sumi Shimamoto at Hitoshi Doi's Seiyuu Database

1954 births
Living people
Japanese film actresses
Japanese television actresses
Japanese stage actresses
Japanese video game actresses
Japanese voice actresses
People from Kōchi, Kōchi
Voice actors from Kōchi Prefecture
Toho Gakuen School of Music alumni
20th-century Japanese actresses
21st-century Japanese actresses